Boonsong Arjtaweekul (born 2 September 1936) is a Thai sprinter. He competed in the men's 4 × 100 metres relay at the 1960 Summer Olympics.

References

External links
 

1936 births
Living people
Athletes (track and field) at the 1960 Summer Olympics
Boonsong Arjtaweekul
Boonsong Arjtaweekul